Olof-Palme-Platz is a small square in central Berlin next to the Berlin Zoo, since 1991 named after the murdered Swedish Prime Minister Olof Palme.

Mitte
Platz
Squares in Berlin